During the 1995–96 English football season, Southend United F.C. competed in the Football League First Division.

Season summary
In summer of 1995, former Liverpool player Ronnie Whelan agreed to become player-manager, and Southend finished 14th in Division One in his first season as a manager.

Final league table

Results
Southend United's score comes first

Legend

Football League First Division

FA Cup

League Cup

Anglo-Italian Cup

Squad

Southend United F.C. seasons
Southend United